The following units and commanders fought in the Battle of Quatre Bras on 16June 1815 at Quatre Bras in the Belgian province of Wallonia. The numbers following each unit are the approximate strengths of that unit.

Anglo-allied Army

Headquarters and support regiments
Field Marshal Arthur Wellesley, Duke of Wellington

Major General Prince Willem of Orange G.C.B.

I Corps

II Corps

Reserve
Under the command of Wellington.

Brunswick Corps
Frederick William, Duke of Brunswick-Wolfenbüttel (KIA)

Cavalry Corps

French Army

Left Wing, Armee du Nord
Marshal of the Empire Michel Ney

II Corps
Gen de Division Honoré Charles Reille

III Cavalry Corps
Gen de Corps d'Armee François Étienne de Kellermann, Comte de Valmy

See also
 Order of Battle of the Waterloo Campaign

Notes

References
 Erwin Muilwijk, Quatre Bras, Perponcher's gamble, Sovereign House Books, 2013. .

Napoleonic Wars orders of battle